The Irish Social Season was a period of aristocratic entertainment and social functions that stretched from January to St. Patrick's Day of a given year. During this period, the major and minor nobility left their country residences and lived in Georgian mansions in places like Rutland Square (now Parnell Square), Mountjoy Square, Merrion Square and Fitzwilliam Square in Dublin. Those with less financial means lived in (or in some cases rented) smaller properties in streets nearby.

The focal point of the Social Season was the move of the Lord Lieutenant of Ireland (the King's representative) from his 'out of season' residence, the Viceregal Lodge (now Áras an Uachtaráin, the residence of the President of Ireland) to live in state in the Viceregal Apartments in Dublin Castle, where he and his wife hosted a series of levées, drawing rooms, banquets and balls in the Castle.

The period of the social season also coincided with the parliamentary sessions of the Irish House of Lords, which many of the peers in Dublin would be attending. However the Irish Parliament was abolished with the Act of Union which merged the Kingdoms of Great Britain and Ireland in 1801.

With the abolition of the lord lieutenancy in 1922, the emergence of a new nationalist state (the Irish Free State) the same year, and the economic and social downturn that resulted from World War I, the Social Season dwindled and then died. Most of the aristocratic homes in Merrion Square and Fitzwilliam Square were sold and are now used as corporate offices.

Among the Irish peers who would reside in Dublin during the 'Social Season' were

The Duke of Leinster (Ireland's senior peer)
The Marquess of Slane
The Duke of Ormonde
Viscount Powerscourt
The Earl of Fingall
The Earl of Headfort

References 

Social history of Ireland
Irish culture
High society (social class)
Seasons